The 25th Annual Australian Recording Industry Association Music Awards (generally known as ARIA Music Awards or simply The ARIAs) were a series of award ceremonies which included the 2011 ARIA Artisan Awards, ARIA Hall of Fame Awards, ARIA Fine Arts Awards and ARIA Awards. The latter ceremony took place on 27 November at the Allphones Arena, Sydney, and was telecast Nine Network's channel Go! at 7:30pm. The final nominees for ARIA Award categories were announced on 11 October as well as nominees and winners for Fine Arts Awards and Artisan Awards.

For the second time in ARIA Awards history, public votes were used for the categories, "Most Popular International Artist" and "Most Popular Australian Artist"; and for the first time for a new category "Most Popular Australian Live Artist".

The ARIA Hall of Fame inducted Kylie Minogue and The Wiggles – including former member Greg Page – on 27 November at the same ceremony as the ARIA Awards.

Presenters and performers

Presenters 

Adam Hills presented the awards for "Breakthrough Artist – Single" and "Breakthrough Artist – Album".
Tom Ballard and Alex Dyson presented the award for "Best Independent Release".
Hamish & Andy presented the awards for "Best Urban Album", "Best Dance Release" and "Best Country Album".
Benji Madden and Joel Madden presented the awards for "Best Rock Album" and "Best Comedy Release".
Katie Noonan and Iva Davies presented the award for "Best Pop Release".
Stevie Nicks and Richard Wilkins presented the award for "Best Adult Contemporary Album".
Ricki-Lee Coulter and James Kerley presented the awards for "Most Popular Australian Artist", "Most Popular International Artist" and "Most Popular Australian Live Artist".
Noah Taylor and Christina Amphlett presented the award for "Best Group".
Delta Goodrem presented the awards for "Best Male Artist" and "Best Female Artist".
Missy Higgins presented the awards for "Single of the Year" and "Album of the Year".
Molly Meldrum and Prime Minister Julia Gillard inducted Kylie Minogue into the Hall of Fame.
David Wenham inducted The Wiggles into the Hall of Fame.
James Mathison
Erin McNaught
Ruby Rose

Performers 

Drapht performed his song "Rapunzel".
Cut Copy performed their song "Need You Now".
Art vs. Science performed their song "Magic Fountain".
Guy Sebastian sang a medley of "Who's That Girl" and "Don't Worry Be Happy".
Geoffrey Gurrumul Yunupingu performed his song, "Warwu", accompanied by Missy Higgins on piano.
 In 2019 Double J's Dan Condon described this as one of "7 great performances from the history of the ARIA Awards."
Gotye and Kimbra performed their award-winning single "Somebody That I Used to Know".
The Living End sang "The Ending Is Just the Beginning Repeating", the lead single from their album.
Delta Goodrem performed a cover version of Wendy Matthews' "The Day You Went Away", in tribute to those we've lost from the Australian Music Industry in the past 25 years.
Boy & Bear performed their award-winning single "Feeding Line".

ARIA Hall of Fame Inductees 

The ARIA Hall of Fame induction occurred on 27 November 2011 as part of the overall ARIA Music Awards. Molly Meldrum introduced Prime Minister of Australia, Julia Gillard, who inducted Kylie Minogue; while actor, David Wenham, inducted The Wiggles – including former member Greg Page.

Nominees and winners

ARIA Awards 

Winners are listed first and highlighted in boldface.

Fine Arts Awards
Winners are listed first and highlighted in boldface.

Artisan Awards 
Winners are listed first and highlighted in boldface.

See also 
Music of Australia

Notes

References

External links 

2011 in Australian music
2011 music awards
ARIA Music Awards